Bhaskar Thapa (September 7, 1963 – June 19, 2013) was a Nepalese-American tunnel engineer who led the engineering of the  Caldecott Tunnel Fourth Bore project. He is considered an expert of the New Austrian tunnelling method (NATM). The Caldecott Tunnel passes through California State Route 24 and connects Alameda County and Contra Costa County, California. The project had an estimated cost of $391 million He had presented his tunnel technology programme at Ministry of Physical Infrastructure and Transport (Nepal) and was very keen to work on Kathmandu Terai Fast Track. He is a member of Jacobs Associates, an engineering firm based on California. He has received his PhD on geotechnical engineering from UC Berkeley and an engineering degrees from Carnegie Mellon University. He died from heart failure while playing tennis on June 19, 2013. A plaque rests above the Caldecott Tunnel in Oakland, California in tribute of Bhaskar's work and life.
 In 2016, the Bhaskar Tejshree Memorial Foundation released a compilation book of works done on tunnel engineering by Bhaskar.

Family 
Bhaskar is the son of diplomat and former minister Dr. Bhekh Bahadur Thapa and public health specialist Dr. Rita Thapa. He grew up in Kathmandu, Nepal. He has two sisters, Manjushree Thapa and Tejshree. Bhaskar grew up in Nepal and attended university in the United States, where he completed his Bachelors, Masters, and PhD in Civil Engineering. Bhaskar and his wife, Sumira, have two sons.

References

External links 

American civil engineers
American people of Nepalese descent
2013 deaths
1963 births